Portrait is the second album by the American pop group The Walker Brothers. Released in 1966 the album was their most successful and reached number three on the UK Albums Chart. The group's musical accompaniment was directed by Ivor Raymonde and Reg Guest and produced by John Franz. Receiving good to mixed reviews the album was first released in both Mono and Stereo LP formats in August 1966. The album was later released on CD having been remastered and expanded in 1998. The sleeve notes were written by Keith Altham with photography by Dezo Hoffmann.

Portrait was not released in the USA. In its place Smash Records compiled The Sun Ain't Gonna Shine Anymore as the group's second album. This alternate version substituted the majority of the album's tracks with A-Sides, B-Sides and tracks from their first EP leaving only "Just For A Thrill", "Old Folks", "People Get Ready" and "Take It Like a Man".

Reception
Portrait received good to mixed reviews from the majority of critics.

Legacy
Richie Unterberger writing for Allmusic recommends the album for serious fans only as the majority of the best tracks are on the compilation After the Lights Go Out. "Like some other pop/rock LPs of its time, it suffered from an apparent strategy to appeal to a wider demographic than those that typically bought pop/rock records, adding a cover of Louis Armstrong's "Just for a Thrill," the moldy standard "Old Folks," and the pedestrian white-boy soul workout on Curtis Mayfield's "People Get Ready." Unterberger is also positive regarding "In My Room" which he describes as "dramatic" and "No Sad Songs for Me" which he calls "melodramatic" and "the best tune that doesn't show up on the After the Lights Go Out compilation".

Track listing

Personnel
The Walker Brothers
Gary Walker - drums, vocals
John Walker - guitar, vocals
Scott Walker - vocals, guitar, keyboards
with:
Ivor Raymonde, Reg Guest - music director
Dezo Hoffmann - photography

Charts

References

1966 albums
The Walker Brothers albums
Albums produced by Johnny Franz
Philips Records albums